"Family Affair" is a 1971 number-one hit single recorded by Sly and the Family Stone for the Epic Records label. Their first new material since the double A-sided single "Thank You (Falettinme Be Mice Elf Agin)"/ "Everybody Is a Star" nearly two years prior, "Family Affair" became the third and final number-one pop single for the band. In 2021, Rolling Stone magazine ranked the song 57th on their list of the 500 Greatest Songs of All Time. The cover version by John Legend, Joss Stone, and Van Hunt, won the Grammy Award for Best R&B Performance by a Duo or Group with Vocals at 49th Annual Grammy Awards.

Overview

Released on November 6, 1971, "Family Affair" was markedly different from the earlier Sly & the Family Stone hits. Engineering consultant Richard Tilles muted most of Sly Stone's guitar parts while emphasizing the electric piano played by Billy Preston and "edit[ing] the rhythm box to sound like a heartbeat," according to David Hepworth.

"Family Affair" was the most successful hit of Sly & the Family Stone's career, peaking at number-one on the Billboard Hot 100 for three weeks,  while achieving the same on the Billboard R&B Singles chart for five weeks. Billboard ranked it as the No. 79 song for 1972.

Chart history

Weekly charts

Year-end charts

Notable covers and derivative recordings
"Family Affair" has been heavily covered, with versions by Tyrone Davis, The Brothers Johnson, MFSB, Iggy Pop, Bunny Wailer, Andrew Roachford, and many more. The song's drum machine-created rhythm was duplicated in several early to mid-1970s recordings, in particular The Temptations' "Let Your Hair Down" (1973), and Stevie Wonder's "You Haven't Done Nothin'" (1974).

Chuck Brown & the Soul Searchers performed a Go-go rendition for the album Go Go Swing Live (1986).

Madonna featured this song as an intro to "Keep It Together" on her Blond Ambition Tour in 1990. 
Australian singer Stephen Cummings released a version as the second single from his fifth studio album, Good Humour. A rap-infused, danceable cover was released by German Milli Vanilli spinoff band Try 'N' B in 1992. Another retooled cover was done in 1993 by Shabba Ranks featuring Patra and Terri & Monica as a single for the Addams Family Values soundtrack. This version charted on the Billboard pop chart at number 84, number 16 on the R&B chart, and number-six on the Hot Rap Tracks chart.  Prince sampled the song on his track "Y Should Eye Do That When Eye Can Do This?".

MFSB version

MFSB recorded an instrumental version of the song as their debut single, from their 1973 debut album MFSB.

Personnel
 Sly Stone — vocals, bass guitar, electric guitar and rhythm machine pre-set
Rose Stone — vocals
 Billy Preston — Hohner Pianet
 Bobby Womack — rhythm guitar

Chart history

Sly & the Family Stone original

Shabba Ranks version

See also
Hot 100 number-one hits of 1971 (USA)
R&B number-one hits of 1971 (USA)
R&B number-one hits of 1972 (USA)

References

Songs about families
1971 singles
1991 singles
1993 singles
Funk songs
Psychedelic soul songs
Sly and the Family Stone songs
1973 debut singles
MFSB songs
Stephen Cummings songs
Billboard Hot 100 number-one singles
Cashbox number-one singles
RPM Top Singles number-one singles
Song recordings produced by Sly Stone
Songs written by Sly Stone
1971 songs
Epic Records singles
Philadelphia International Records singles